Mark Nauseef (born June 11, 1953), in Cortland, New York, is a drummer and percussionist who has enjoyed a varied career, ranging from rock music during the 1970s with his time as a member of the Ian Gillan Band and, temporarily with Thin Lizzy when Brian Downey left for a short time, to a wide range of musical styles in more recent times, playing with many notable musicians from all over the world.

Career
Nauseef briefly toured the United Kingdom in 1972 as tour member of The Velvet Underground before joining Elf, fronted by Ronnie James Dio, in early 1975, but the group disbanded shortly afterwards. Accompanied by Elf keyboardist Mickey Lee Soule, Nauseef joined ex-Deep Purple singer Ian Gillan in his new jazz fusion group, simply named the Ian Gillan Band. After three albums, Gillan broke the group up in 1978. Nauseef stood in for Thin Lizzy drummer Brian Downey for two international tours, then joined Gary Moore's short-lived band G-Force.

During the 1980s, Nauseef moved away from rock music towards a wide range of styles, including Javanese and Balinese gamelan, as well as music of Indian and Ghanaian origin. He has released several solo albums and worked with many other musicians in an array of different projects.

Nauseef has performed and/or recorded with such artists as Joachim Kühn, Gary Moore, Jack Bruce, Bill Laswell, Glenn Hughes, Rabih Abou-Khalil, Trilok Gurtu, Steve Swallow, L. Shankar, Hamza El Din, The Velvet Underground, Joëlle Léandre, Ikue Mori, Ronnie James Dio, Markus Stockhausen, Kyai Kunbul (Javanese Gamelan), Andy Summers, Tony Oxley, Tomasz Stanko, Kenny Wheeler, Edward Vesala's "Sound and Fury", Thelma Houston, David Torn, The Ladzekpo Brothers (Ghanaian music and dance), Charlie Mariano, The Gamelan Orchestra of Saba (Balinese Gamelan), Kudsi Erguner, Philip Lynott, George Lewis, Evan Parker and Lou Harrison. Throughout most of these projects Nauseef has collaborated with Walter Quintus.

Nauseef attended the California Institute of the Arts where he studied Javanese Gamelan with K.R.T. Wasitodiningrat, Balinese Gamelan with I Nyoman Wenten, North Indian Pakhawaj drumming with Pandit Taranath Rao, North Indian music theory with Pandit Amiya Dasgupta, Ghanaian drumming and dance with Kobla and Alfred Ladzekpo, Dzidzorgbe Lawluvi and C.K. Ganyo, and 20th Century Western percussion techniques and hand drumming with John Bergamo. He also studied frame drum techniques of the Middle East, India and the Caucasus with Glen Velez. It was also at CalArts that Nauseef began a very creative and productive relationship, which continues to this day, with musical "alter ego", guitarist Miroslav Tadic. Together, they have composed, recorded and produced a wide range of music in situations from duo to large ensembles with musicians from around the world.

Nauseef has also worked as a producer. In addition to his own recordings, he has produced many records of various types of music including modern experimental forms as well as traditional forms. Traditional music productions include numerous recordings of traditional Balinese and Javanese music such as the acclaimed and award-winning "The Music of K.R.T. Wasitodiningrat" which was recorded in Java and features Wasitodiningrat's compositions. Other examples include the Balinese ensemble recordings "Gamelan Batel Wayang Ramayana" and "Gender Wayang Pemarwan" which were recorded in Bali. These recordings and many others of Indonesian music were produced for the CMP 3000 "World Series" with the production team of Kurt Renker And Walter Quintus. The "Worlds Series", which Nauseef was instrumental in establishing, was founded by CMP owner and producer Kurt Renker and produces recordings from a variety of non-western countries including India, Turkey, Korea, Indonesia and others.

Discography

Jack Bruce
A Question Of Time with Allan Holdsworth, Tony Williams, Ginger Baker, Albert Collins, Nicky Hopkins, Zakir Hussain, a.o., 1989
Somethin Els with Dave Liebman, Eric Clapton, Trilok Gurtu, Clem Clempson, a.o., 1993
The Jack Bruce Collector's Edition with Gary Moore, Ginger Baker, Eric Clapton, a.o., 1996
Can You Follow?, Jack Bruce with John McLaughlin, Tony Williams, Frank Zappa, Cream, John Mayall, Chris Spedding, a.o., 2008

The Velvet Underground
 Disc 3 of Final V.U. 1971-1973, 2001

Elf
Trying to Burn the Sun, 1975

Ian Gillan Band
Child in Time, 1976
Clear Air Turbulence, 1977
Scarabus, 1977
Live at the Budokan, 1978

Thin Lizzy
The Boys Are Back in Town: Live in Australia, 1978

Gary Moore's G-Force
G-Force, 1980 with Tony Newton, Willie Dee

Philip Lynott
Solo in Soho, 1980 with Gary Moore, Mark Knopfler, a.o.
The Philip Lynott Album, 1982 with Mark Knopfler, Mel Collins, Pierre Moerlen, Gary Moore, a.o.
 
Solo and others
Nightline New York, Joachim Kühn with Michael Brecker, Billy Hart, Bob Mintzer, Eddie Gómez, 1981
Information, with Joachim Kühn and George Kochbeck, 1981
Personal Note, with Joachim Kühn, Trilok Gurtu, Jan Akkerman, Detlev Beier, 1982
Sura, with Joachim Kühn, Markus Stockhausen, Trilok Gurtu, Detlev Beier and David Torn, 1983
I'm Not Dreaming, Joachim Kühn with Ottomar Borwitzky, Rolf Kühn, Herbert Försch, George Lewis, 1983
Wun Wun, with Jack Bruce and Trilok Gurtu, 1985
Dark, 1986
Dark: Tamna Voda, with L. Shankar and David Torn, 1989
Let's Be Generous, 1993
Bracha, with Miroslav Tadić, David Philipson and John Bergamo, 1989
Let's Be Generous, with Miroslav Tadić, Joachim Kühn, and Tony Newton, 1991
Keys To Talk By, with Dušan Bogdanović and Miroslav Tadić, 1992
The Snake Music, Miroslav Tadić, Jack Bruce, Markus Stockhausen, David Torn, Wolfgang Puschnig and Walter Quintus, 1994
The Sultan's Picnic Rabih Abou-Khalil with Steve Swallow, Kenny Wheeler, Charlie Mariano, Milton Cardona, Nabil Khaiat, Howard Levy, Michel Godard, 1984
Old Country, with Miroslav Tadić and Howard Levy, 1996
Baby Universe, Jadranka Stojaković with Miroslav Tadic, Yasuhiro Kobayashi, Jumpei Sakuma, Yoshiko Sakata, Michel Godard, Howard Levy, 1996 
Still Light, with Miroslav Tadić and Markus Stockhausen, 1997
Loose Wires, with Miroslav Tadić and Michel Godard, 1997
Odd Times, Rabih Abou-Khalil with Howard Levy, Nabil Khaiat, Michel Godard
OCRE with Sylvie Courvoisier, Pierre Charial, Michel Godard and Tony Overwater, 1996
Birds Of A Feather with Sylvie Courvoisier, 1997
Ottomania, with Kudsi Erguner, 1999
Sarabande, Jon Lord, with Andy Summers, Paul Karass, Pete York, The Philharmonia Hungarica, Eberhard Schoener, LP 1976, CD 1999
With Space in Mind, Solo 2000
Venus Square Mars, with David Philipson and Hamza El Din, 2000
Islam Blues, Kudsi Erguner with Nguyen Le and Renaud Garcia-Fons, 2001
Gazing Point, with Kudsi Erguner and Markus Stockhausen, 2002
Evident, with Joëlle Léandre, 2004
Snakish, with Wadada Leo Smith, Miroslav Tadić, Walter Quintus, Katya Quintus, 2005
Albert, with Ikue Mori, Walter Quintus and Sylvie Courvoisier, 2006
 At The Le Mans Jazz Festival, Joëlle Léandre with Maggie Nicols, Irene Schweizer, William Parker, India Cooke, Markus Stockhausen, Paul Lovens, Sebi Tramontana, Carlos Zingaro, 2006 Can You Follow?, Jack Bruce with John McLaughlin, Tony Williams, Frank Zappa, Cream, John Mayall, a.o., 2008No Matter, with Bill Laswell, Markus Stockhausen and Kudsi Erguner, 2008Orte, Raymond Theler with Walter Quintus and Marcio Doctor, 2008Air, Dave Liebman with Marcio Doctor, Walter Quintus, Markus Stockhausen, a.o., 2011Aspiration, with Alice Coltrane, Carlos Santana, Kudsi Erguner, Zakir Hussain, Pharoah Sanders, a.o., 2011City Of Leaves, Sussan Deyhim with Bill Laswell, Kudsi Erguner, a.o., 2011Near Nadir, with Ikue Mori, Evan Parker and Bill Laswell, 2011Spaces & Spheres, with Stefano Scodanibbio, Tara Bouman, Fabrizio Ottaviucci, Markus Stockhausen, 2013as the wind, with Evan Parker, Toma Gouband, 2016All In All In All, with  Arthur Jarvinen, Tony Oxley, Pat Thomas, Sylvie Courvoisier, Walter Quintus, Bill Laswell, Miroslav Tadić, 2018Locked Hybrids, Matthew Wright with Evan Parker, Toma Gouband, 2020Warszawa 2019, Evan Parker’s ElectroAcoustic Ensemble, 2020

BibliographyArcana V: Musicians on Music, Magic & Mysticism, Hips Road: New York, Edited by John Zorn with writings by Meredith Monk, Fred Frith, Terry Riley, Pauline Oliveros, Alvin Curran, Gavin Bryars, a.o., 2010The Drum and Percussion Cookbook: Creative Recipes for Players and Teachers, Meredith Music / Hal Leonard, Edited by Rick Mattingly with writings by Peter Erskine, Bill Bruford, Valerie Dee Naranjo, Anthony Cirone, Robin Engelman, Bill Cahn, She-e Wu, John Beck, Glenn Kotche, a.o., 2008 
 Shamanism and Tantra in the Himalayas,  Inner Traditions by Claudia Müller-Ebeling, Christian Rätsch and Surendra Bahadur Shahi, 2002Practicing and Making Music...Without Your Instrument,  Published in The Percussive Arts Society journal PERCUSSIVE NOTES (Oct. 1992)
 Music Practice as Meditation,  Published in The Percussive Arts Society journal PERCUSSIVE NOTES (Feb. 2007)
 
FilmographyKibyoshi, Ikue Mori with Makigami Koichi, DVD 2011Unlimited 23, with Ikue Mori, Sylvie Courvoisier, Kazuhisa Uchihashi, Makigami Koichi, Lotte Anker, Maja Ratkje, Zeena Parkins,  David Watson,  Peter Evans, a.o., DVD 2011The Haunting of Julia (original title Full Circle), with Mia Farrow, Keir Dullea and Tom Conti. Music composed by Colin Towns. LP 1977 CD 1995Live At The Rainbow Theatre, London 1977, The Ian Gillan Band. VHS and DVD''

References

External links 
 http://www.marknauseef.com/

1953 births
Living people
American rock drummers
People from Cortland, New York
Thin Lizzy members
American session musicians
Pupils of K. P. H. Notoprojo
20th-century American drummers
American male drummers
20th-century American male musicians
Elf (band) members
Ian Gillan Band members
Leo Records artists